El Puerto de Santa María ("the Port of Saint Mary"), locally known as El Puerto and historically in English as Port Saint Mary, is a municipality of Spain located on the banks of the Guadalete River in the province of Cádiz, Andalusia. , the city has a population of c. 88,184, of which some 50,000 live in the urban center, and the remainder in the surrounding areas.

History
According to the legend told in the Odyssey of Homer, after the Trojan War a Greek official named Menestheus escaped with his troops through the Straits of Gibraltar and reached the Guadalete River. They established themselves here and called that port Menestheus's port or Menesthei Portus, after the oracle of Menestheus, to whom, also, the inhabitants of Gades offered sacrifices.

In 711, Arab (Moors) from the North of Africa conquered southern Spain. They renamed the place Alcante or Alcanatif which means Port of Salt, due to the old salt industry of Phoenicians and Romans.

In 1260, Alfonso X of Castile conquered the city from the Moors and renamed it Santa María del Puerto. He organized the land distribution and conceded a charter under the Crown of Castile. Having received a royal charter the city was then allowed to use the title "El" prior to the name of the city itself. This is a distinguishing property and even though Madrid is the capital of Spain it has not earned this distinction.
In his Cantigas de Santa Maria CSM 367, Alfonso sings that he was miraculously healed of swollen legs after visiting his church of Santa María do Porto.

Christopher Columbus's first expedition to the Americas set sail from El Puerto de Santa María. His pilot, Juan de la Cosa drew his world map (the first including the coast of New World) in El Puerto in 1500.

Columbus visited El Puerto in 1480 and received encouragement for his travel plans. He also met Juan de la Cosa who issued the first world map in 1500.

El Puerto was the residence of several wealthy cargadores, merchants who operated Spain's trade with the Americas.

During the 16th and 17th centuries, it was the winter port of the royal galleys.

In the nineteenth century the city became the General Headquarters for the French Army during the Peninsular War under the reign of Joseph Bonaparte (1801–1812).

The town is steeped in history, museums and monuments. It is also within easy reach of the historical cities of Seville and Cádiz.

Geography

El Puerto de Santa María is located on the Atlantic coast of the Bay of Cádiz, near the municipalities of Jerez de la Frontera, Rota, Puerto Real, and Cádiz. It is popular for its sherry and for its beaches, which are the town's principal tourist attraction. Well known beaches include Vistahermosa, Valdelagrana, and La Puntilla. Like many other southern cities, there are many smaller towns encompassed by the municipality. There is also a major port, known as Puerto Sherry. A large amount of land has been devoted to the Bay of Cádiz Nature Reserve.

Economy

The most important economic activity is tourism, mainly because of the beaches, as well as the bullfights held at the arena during the summer. The town also hosts large groups of motorcyclists during the Jerez Motorcycle Grand Prix. There is commercial development in the center and periphery, and a highly developed wine industry.

Culture
Listed are a few of the main fiestas in the area:
 Spring Carnival: Cádiz is the home of Carnival with fancy dress and parades in the streets usually ending on the Tuesday 47 days before Easter.
 Semana Santa: Holy Week the week that leads up to Easter Sunday is a wonderful time to enjoy the area with its street parades and long lines of penitents and big crowds. In El Puerto de Santa María, there are daily parades from Palm Sunday to Easter Sunday.
 Campeonato de España (Motorbikes Races): A weekend fiesta of music and dance in April World Championships of Motorcycling.
 Feria del Vino Fino (Spring's fair): El Puerto de Santa María's local week of fiesta, dancing sherry drinking and sevillana dancing this is usually in the middle of May. This is the principal festival is the Feria de Primavera (Spring Fair), held between the fifth and sixth week after Holy Week. In recent years, it has coincided with May 1.
 Romería del Rocio: Festive pilgrimage of up to one million people to the village of Rocio in Almonte, Huelva, usually around the third week of May.
 Hogueras de San Juan: Midsummer bonfires and fireworks on the beaches in most areas of Cádiz on 23 June.
 Dia de la Virgen del Carmen: One of the most popular Saint of El Puerto de Santa María and all fishermen is the Virgen Del Carmen, and on the 16th of July, her image (statue) is taken from the local Church, carried into the sea on board a fishing boat, and then paraded around the town. A general day of festivities.
 Virgen de los Milagros: The saint of the city is La Virgen de los Milagros (Virgin of the Miracles). The festivity is on September the 8th. Her image is taken from the principal church and carried to the street, and then paraded around the town over a carpet of flowers. It is a local day of festivities.

Main sights

 Bullring of El Puerto, which dates back to 1880 with space for 15,000 spectators.
 Iglesia Mayor Prioral, known from 1486
 Castle of San Marcos, a fortified church built over the remains of a 10th-century Islamic mosque. It was built by order of Alfonso X of Castile from 1364, also using parts of an ancient Roman edifice nearby.
 Monastery of the Victory (early 16th century), built by the Dukes of Medinaceli
 Hermitage of Santa Clara (16th-18th century)
 Convent of the Holy Spirit (15th century)
 Church of San Francisco (next to San Luis Gonzaga building)
 Church of San Joaquín
 Convent of Santo Domingo
 Hospital of San Juan de Dios
 Convent of Esclavas del Sagrado Corazón de Jesús
 Convent of La Concepción
 Chapel of Aurora
 Monastery of San Miguel
 Hospital of Divina Providencia (Hospitalito)
 Palace of Aranibar
 Palace of Almirante Valdivieso
 Antiguo Matadero
 Palace of Imblusqueta
 Palace of Marqués de Villarreal y Purullena
 Palace of Álvarez-Cuevas
 Casa Vizarrón (Casa de las cadenas)
 Casa de los Rivas
 Antiguo Pósito
 Casa de los Diezmos
 Fountain of Galeras
 Casa de la Placilla
 Casa de Roque Aguado
 Fountain of prison
 San Luis Gonzaga building
 Antigua Aduana
 Antigua Lonja ("Ancient Loggia"), located in the port and dating to the 18th century.
 Museo Arqueológico Municipal
 Several towers

El Puerto de Santa María is situated in the middle of the Parque natural Bahia de Cádiz. This include ) of pine forest which form one part of the three ecosystems in the area. An endangered species of chameleon along with other reptiles and birds of immense variety can be found in the forest. Egyptian mongoose can also be spotted in the area. The area boasts  two other natural parks, the Sierra de Grazalema and El Coto Donaña.

Events
Bullfighting is still enjoyed during the Feria season during the month of August, and during the Feria de la Primavera (Spring Fair) in early May. This Feria is dedicated to sherry wine and 180,000 half bottles are drunk in 4 days. There are several bodegas (wineries) in the town centre, all of which can be visited by the public. The most famous bodegas in El Puerto are Osborne and Terry both of which export sherry and brandy worldwide. In the cellars of El Puerto, the dry, pale sherry known as Fino is produced using the traditional method called solera. This method produces Fino, the sweet Muscatel, Amontillado and the older Oloroso.

International relations

Twin towns – Sister cities

El Puerto de Santa María is twinned with:
  La Güera, Western Sahara
  Coral Gables, Florida, United States
  Texcoco, Mexico
  Brighton, United Kingdom
  Calp, Spain

Notable people

 Pedro Muñoz Seca, playwright
 Rafael Alberti, poet of the Spanish Generation of 1927
 Juan Modesto, Republican general
 Valentín Galarza Morante, minister of Francisco Franco
 Pedro Pérez Fernández, playwright
 Juan Antonio de Vizarrón y Eguiarreta, viceroy and archbishop
 Torcuato Benjumeda, architect
 Francisco Javier de Burgos y Sarragoiti, journalist
 José Cordero de Torres, clockmaker
 Joaquín Sánchez Rodríguez, football player
 José Manuel Pinto, football player
 Abraham Paz, football player
 Girolamo Lagomarsini, Italian humanist

Gallery

See also
 History of Sherry
 List of Bienes de Interés Cultural in El Puerto de Santa María
 List of mayors of El Puerto de Santa María

References

External links

 Official webpage
 Cultural Information of the Monuments and Museums of El Puerto de Santa María
 Journal of history of El Puerto
 360° Panoramic walk of El Puerto de Santa María

 
Costa de la Luz
Municipalities of the Province of Cádiz
Port cities and towns on the Spanish Atlantic coast
Sherry
Classical oracles
Greek colonies in Iberia